Shri Bhaskar Choudhury  (1945–1994) was an active Indian politician from Shillong, Meghalaya. He was an important member of the Indian National Congress Party. Meghalaya District Council, in office from 1972 to 1977. Meghalaya Legislative Assembly, in office from 1978 to 1988 (2 terms).

Education and early life 
Shri Bhaskar Choudhury was born on 1 November 1945, into a prominent family of eminent scholars and freedom fighters.

Choudhury was a Xaverian from St.Xaviers College, Calcutta. He held a bachelor's degree in Law and a master's degree in Commerce, both from the University of Calcutta.

His interest in sports led him to represent Calcutta University as a joint secretary of the executive committee of the athletic team, cricket team and Basketball team in 1967–1968. He was awarded the Principal S Roy Memorial Shield in Cricket. "Inter Collegiate Champion" in Basket Ball of University College of Law, Calcutta, was amongst his list of honours. Xaviers College, Calcutta, was privileged to have him as an active team player in badminton.

He became involved with politics from his early college life & was soon serving as an active member in a variety of positions within the University Union.

Family 
Shri Bhaskar Chouhdury was born to Smt.Sabitri Choudhury and Shri Binoy Bhushan Choudhury (An Electrical Engineer and a Freedom Fighter).His elder uncle, Shri Bidhu Bhushan Choudhury, a Civil Engineer of Undivided Assam, who constructed the road to the Shakti Temple of Goddess Kamakhya in Nilachal Hills. His younger uncle, Shri Bibhu Bhushan Choudhury was involved with the freedom movement and had started Asomiya Sahitya Mandir, Charu Sahitya Kutir, Jatiya Sahitya Parishad, Bimal Prakash Bhavan and was one of the founders of Shillong College. Bhaskar Choudhury was married to Smt.Sunanda Choudhury (Retd. school teacher) in 1971. His elder daughter, Meenakshi is a Software Engineer and younger daughter Sukanya is a Media Professional.

Professional and political career 
A lawyer by profession, he practiced in both Shillong High Court and Guwahati High Courts. Choudhury was the member of Bar Association, Shillong.

Shri Bhaskar Choudhury was first elected in the MDC (Meghalaya District Council) elections held in 1972. He was the first Non Khasi to win the MDC elections from the state. In office from 1972 to 1977. It was in 1977, he decided to join the fray in the Meghalaya Legislative Assembly elections, where he was elected from Laban constituency as MLA. In office from 1978 to 1988 (2 terms).

Choudhury was the Vice Chairman of Law Commission, Meghalaya.

Choudhury had immense contribution as president of Sanatan Dharmasabha Harisabha, one of the oldest Hindu religious institute in Shillong. With his initiative, the foundation stone of the temple was laid in Harisabha.

He was holding the position of President in Laban Girls Higher Secondary School & Lumparing Vidyapeeth Higher Secondary School (Govt Affiliated).

He died unexpectedly on 12 September 1994.

Honours and recognition 
Honouring him and paying tribute to his invaluable contributions, he made towards the society, the bust of Shri Bhaskar Choudhury was unveiled by the people of Shillong on 13 September 2017.

References 



1945 births
1994 deaths
Indian National Congress politicians from Meghalaya
People from Shillong
Meghalaya politicians
20th-century Indian politicians
20th-century Indian lawyers
Meghalaya MLAs 1978–1983
Meghalaya MLAs 1983–1988